Berdashen is a village in the Amasia Municipality of the Shirak Province of Armenia. The Statistical Committee of Armenia reported the village's population as 215 in 2018.

Demographics

References 

Communities in Shirak Province
Populated places in Shirak Province